Samuel Cunningham (April 8, 1848 – January 14, 1919) was a politician from Northwest Territories, Canada.

Cunningham was the son of John Cunningham, and Rosalie L' Hirondelle. His grandfather Patrick Cunningham was from Soligo Ireland who came to work for the Hudson's Bay Company, and his grandmother was Nancy Anne Bruce from Luisianna (daughter of Benjamin Bruce from the Orkney Islands of Scotland and Matilda who was Mohawk)  Sam Cunningham was born at Lac Ste. Anne, Alberta District. He was married to Susan Gray. He was a pioneer in the St. Albert area, having been the opener of St. Albert Trail and participating in the Riel Rebellion of 1885 as a member of the St. Albert Mounted Riflemen.

He was elected to the Northwest Territories Legislative Assembly for the electoral district of St. Albert by acclimation in the 1885 Northwest Territories election. His district was merged into the Edmonton electoral district for the first general election held on June 30, 1888. In that election he was defeated finishing third out of four candidates behind Frank Oliver and Herbert Charles Wilson.

Samuel Cunningham was experienced in acting as an advisor and intermediary between Aboriginal and European People and was fluent in English, French, and Cree. He was one of the interpreters during the negotiations of Treaty No. 8 in Grouard in 1899. He was also literate in English and well acquainted with Canadian law, politics, and business practices. Benoit v. Canada, 2002 FCT 243 (CanLII) at paras. 99–103.

He died in 1919 in Grouard, Alberta.

References

1848 births
1919 deaths
Members of the Legislative Assembly of the Northwest Territories